For the Birds (stylized as for the birds) is a 2000 American computer animated short film produced by Pixar and written and directed by Ralph Eggleston. It won the Academy Award for Best Animated Short Film in 2001. It premiered on June 5, 2000, at the Annecy International Animated Film Festival in France, and was shown alongside the theatrical release of the 2001 Disney/Pixar feature film Monsters, Inc.

It is also available on home video versions of the film. In 2012, the short was re rendered into 3D, and it was theatrically re-released alongside the 3D re-release of Monsters, Inc. The short was also released in 3D on Monsters, Inc. Blu-ray 3D, on February 19, 2013.

Plot
A small blue bird lands on a powerline and makes himself comfortable, only for a second bird to land close by. The two birds start squabbling, and are gradually joined by 13 others of the same species, all bickering for space.

A large, awkward heron-like bird honks and waves at them from a nearby telephone pole, interrupting the squabble. The 15 little birds start imitating his plumage and honk, mockingly, until the bigger bird again calls to them, causing the little birds to scoot further down the wire and quietly gossip about it.

Undeterred, the bigger bird flies and perches between the flock of smaller birds, but his weight causes the powerline to sag almost to the ground. The smaller birds slide down and are squished together against the big bird's sides, one angrily pecking the big bird and making him fall over backwards, hanging upside down. Egged on by the others, the two little birds in the middle start pecking the big bird's toes, which release one-by-one from the wire. One little bird realizes what is about to happen, and warns the others. They stop too late, and the last toe of the big bird releases, snapping the wire like a slingshot and flinging the little birds up in a cloud of feathers.

The bigger bird lands unharmed on the ground, and plays with the floating feathers until one of the smaller birds, now naked, crashes beside him. He sees the naked little bird and laughs at him, offering a leaf for coverage. Later, the other little birds land nearby, also naked. The big bird laughs even harder at the little birds, who quickly hide behind him in shame.

Accolades
For the Birds won the following awards:
2000: 74th Academy Awards—Best Short Animated Film
2001: Vancouver Effects and Animation Festival—Animated Computer 3D Short
2001: Anima Mundi Animation Festival—Best Film x2
2001: Chicago International Children's Film Festival-Short Film or Video—Animation—Second Place
2000: Annie Award—Outstanding Achievement in an Animated Short Subject
2000: Sitges—Catalan International Film Festival—Best Animated Short Film

Easter eggs
A reference to For the Birds was put in the 2006 Disney–Pixar movie Cars. When Lightning McQueen is in the back of Mack, they drive down the freeway and pass a section of power line with the birds resting on top, which is accompanied by the squeaks the birds made to communicate with each other. A similar appearance occurred in Inside Out, while Riley and her family are driving to San Francisco at the beginning of the movie.

The birds can be found in the main hub world for the Kinect game Rush: A Disney-Pixar Adventure.

Releases
For the Birds is one of two short films on the DVD and VHS release of Monsters, Inc. The film was also released as part of Pixar Short Films Collection, Volume 1 in 2007.

References

External links
 
 
 
 

2000 short films
2000 computer-animated films
2000 comedy films
American animated short films
Animated films about birds
Animated films without speech
Best Animated Short Academy Award winners
Best Animated Short Subject Annie Award winners
Pixar short films
2000 animated films
2000s Disney animated short films